Nishterabad (Urdu: نشتر آباد) also spells as Nishtarabad is a residential neighbourhood in Peshawar city of Khyber Pakhtunkhwa province of Pakistan.
Hashtnagri is located to the west while Gulbahar is located to the east of Nishterabad.

Overview and History 
Nishterabad is located off the Grand Trunk (GT) road in Peshawar. It is famous for its CDs and telefilms production and is the hub of CDs and telefilms business but with advent of mobile and internet streaming plus memory card and USB led to decline of CDs production. During its heydays (2004-2010), when the production of CD drama and telefilms business was on its peak, the production companies would produce up to 200 CDs on Eid but now the number is only 45 to 50.

Administrative area 
Nishterabad is part of Pakistan National Assembly seat NA-1 (Peshawar-1) while for KP Provincial Assembly it is part of PF-2 (Peshawar-2).

See also 
 Hashtnagri
 Gulbahar Peshawar

References 

Populated places in Peshawar District